Castellaneta is a railway station in Castellaneta, Italy. The station is located on the Bari–Taranto railway. The train services are operated by Trenitalia.

Train services
The station is served by the following service(s):

Local services (Treno regionale) Bari - Gioia del Colle - Taranto

References

This article is based upon a translation of the Italian language version as at September 2014.

Railway stations in Apulia
Railway stations opened in 1997
Buildings and structures in the Province of Taranto